North Lebanon Township may refer to:

 North Lebanon Township, Sharp County, Arkansas, in Sharp County, Arkansas
 North Lebanon Township, Lebanon County, Pennsylvania

Township name disambiguation pages